John Dow Alexander (August 22, 1903 – June 23, 1994) was a Canadian politician. He served in the Legislative Assembly of New Brunswick from 1960 to 1963 as member of the Liberal party.

References

1903 births
1994 deaths
20th-century Canadian legislators
New Brunswick Liberal Association MLAs
People from Campbellton, New Brunswick